This is a list of songs about Rio de Janeiro, the second largest city in Brazil, or which mention the name of the city in the title or lyrics.

Song listings 

 "A Day in Rio" by Les Baxter
 "A Night in Rio" by Fourplay
 "A Rainy Night in Rio" (from the 1946 film The Time, the Place and the Girl)
 "A Rendezvous In Rio" by Xavier Cugat And His Waldorf-Astoria Orchestra
 "Addio in Rio" by Svend Asmussen & Dieter Reith
 "Ah, Rio" by Ron Carter
 "As Caravanas" by Chico Buarque
 "An der Copacabana" by Erste Allgemeine Verunsicherung
 "Aquele Abraço" by Gilberto Gil
 "Androids In Rio" by Christopher Just (there is an entry for him on German wiki)
 "Aquarela Carioca" by Paulo Steinberg
 "Assim Como o Rio ..." from musical Estudantes 
 "Autumn in Rio" by Nelson Riddle
 "Avenida Central" by Romero Lubambo
 "Avenida Rio Branco" by Azymuth
 "Ay Ay Ay Ay Moosey" by Modern Romance
 "Balanço Carioca" (from the animated film Rio) 
 "Barra da Tijuca (Tijuca Bay)" by John Patitucci
 "Beautiful Lover" by Brotherhood of Man
 "Bedtime for Rio" by Yargo
 "Berimbau Carioca" by Laurindo Almeida
 "Biaozinho Carioca" by Azymuth
 "The Big Brass Band from Brazil" by Art Mooney & His Orchestra 
 "Botafogo (dedicated to Oswald Guerra)" by Darius Milhaud
 "Cabana Carioca" by Spyro Gyra
 "Caboclo do Rio" by Nat King Cole
 "Carioca" by Blue Rondo à la Turk 
 "Carioca" by Chico Buarque
 "Carioca" by Choker Campbell
 "Carioca" (from the musical film Flying Down to Rio)
 "Carioca" by Guido & Maurizio de Angelis
 "Carioca" by Paulinho da Costa
 "Carioca Blue" by Jimmy Bruno & Joe Beck
 "Carioca Fun" by Miecio Askanasy's Braziliana
 "Carioca Hills" by Bud Shank
 "Cariocas" by Adriana Calcanhotto
 "Carnaval in Rio (Carnaval No Rio)" by Djavan
 "Carnevale A Rio" by Umberto Bindi
 "Carnival in Rio (Punk Was)" by Die Toten Hosen
 "Cats of Rio" by Dave Grusin & Lee Ritenour
 "Christmas in Rio" by Stanley Clarke
 "Christmas in Rio" by Tony Martin 
 "Cidade Maravilhosa" by André Filho (1935)
 "Coisa da Rio" by Jeff Gardner & Gary Peacock 
 "Copa Beach" by Luiz Bonfa & Eumir Deodato 
 "Copacabana" by Ary Barroso
 "Copacabana" by The Chakachas
 "Copacabana" by Edmundo Ros
 "Copacabana" by Herbie Mann
 "Copacabana" by Barry Manilow
 "Copacabana" by John Klemmer
 "Copacabana" by Martha and the Muffins
 "Copacabana" by Sailor
 "Copacabana" by Two Man Sound
 "Copacabana (dedicated to Godofredo Leão Velloso)" by Darius Milhaud
 "Copacabana Dreams" by Sérgio Mendes
 "Copacabana Girl" by Les Reed
 "Copacabana, Ipanema, Leblon" by Willie Colón
 "Copacabana Midnight" by Luiz Bonfá 
 "Copacabana Night" by Barry Mason
 "Copacabana Ripple" by Freddy Cole
 "Copacabana Samba" by Joseph Francis Kuhn
 "Corcovado" by Antônio Carlos Jobim
 "Corcovado (dedicated to Madame Henri Hoppenot)" by Darius Milhaud
 "De Janeiro" by R.I.O.
 "Dio in Rio" by JBO
 "Do Leme ao Pontal" by Tim Maia
 "Down to Rio" by Gregg Rolie
 "Dreams of Rio" by Akira Jimbo
 "Ela é Carioca" by Carol Saboya
 "Feitio de Oração" by Noel Rosa
 "Fever in Rio" by Ray Materick
 "Flying Down to Rio", theme song from the Fred Astaire/Ginger Rogers film of the same name
 "Flying Down to Rio" by Drugstore
 "Flying Down to Rio" by Sutherland Brothers and Quiver
 "From Rio with Love" by Jakatta (pseudonym of Dave Lee (DJ))
 "Funk Me Down to Rio" by RAH Band
 "Gavea (dedicated to Madame Henrique Oswald)" by Darius Milhaud
 "The Girl from Ipanema" by Antônio Carlos Jobim
 "Girl from Ipanema Goes to Greenland" by The B-52's
 "Goin' Down to Rio" by Jeff Lynne
 "Goodbye Ipanema" by Lee Konitz
 "Guanabara Bay" by BZN
 "Guaratiba" by Azymuth
 "Gypsy in Rio" by Jean Jacques Perrey 
 "Hello Rio!" by Ottawan
 "Hit 'Em Up" by 2Pac
 "I Go to Rio" by Peter Allen, Pablo Cruise
 "I'm Going to Rio" by Paulinho da Costa
 "In Copacabana" by Blue Barron and his Orchestra 
 "In Rio de Janeiro" by Mireille Mathieu
 "Incident in Rio" by Skeewiff 
 "Ipanema (dedicated to Arthur Rubinstein)" by Darius Milhaud
 "Ipanema Amour" by Mad Professor
 "Ipanema 2000" by Richard Bone
 "Ipanema Lady" by George Duke
 "Ipanema Sol" by Lee Ritenour
 "Ipanema Walk" by Ronnie Foster
 "It's All About The Benjamins" by Puff Daddy & The Family
 "Janeiro" by Mystic Diversions (featuring Mike Francis)
 "Janeiro" by Solid Sessions
 "Je Rêve à Rio" by Robert Charlebois
 "Je vais à Rio" by Claude François
 "Jesus of Rio" by Crosby & Nash
 "Jesus of Rio" by Violent Femmes
 "Knee Deep in Rio" by Maynard Ferguson 
 "La Rua Madureira" by Nino Ferrer
 "Laranjeiras (dedicated to Audrey Parr)" by Darius Milhaud
 "Last Summer in Rio" by Azymuth
 "Leblon" by Romero Lubambo
 "Leme (dedicated to Nininha Velloso-Guerra)" by Darius Milhaud
 "Les Cariocas, Elles Sont Si Belles Les Cariocas" by Sacha Distel
 "Les Rues de Rio" by Caravelli
 "L'incendie de Rio" by Sacha Distel
 "The Lights of Rio" by Johnny Mathis
 "Luá Joá (Moon in Joá)" by Sebastião Tapajós & Zimbo Trio  
 "Lunada en Rio" by Luiz Bonfa 
 "Luzes do Rio" by Luiz Bonfa 
 "Maracana" by Azymuth
 "Maxixe Carioca - Samba" by Roberto Inglez
 "Menino do Rio" by Caetano Veloso
 "Me Rio de Janeiro" by Mecano
 "Me, Myself & Rio" by Doc Powell
 "Meu Lugar" by Arlindo Cruz
 "Meu Rio de Janeiro" Salgueiro
 "Moonlight in Rio" by Luiz Bonfá
 "Morning In" by Earl Klugh
 "Morning in Rio" by Earl Klugh
 "Mourir a Rio" by Claude Morgan (member of Bimbo Jet)
 "My Friend from Rio" by Greg Abate Quintet featuring Richie Cole
 "My Own Way" (Night Mix) by Duran Duran
 "Nancy's Goin' to Rio" (from the musical comedy Nancy Goes to Rio)
 "Next Summer in Rio" by Azymuth
 "New York - Rio - Tokyo" by Trio Rio
 "Ob in Bombay, Ob in Rio" by Mary Roos
 "Oh Rio" by Cuban Soldiers
 "One Night in Rio" by Albert West
 "Only a Dream in Rio" by James Taylor
 "O Nome da Cidade" by Adriana Calcanhotto
 "Out from Rio" by Vernon Dalhart
 "Over Rio" by Quantum Jump
 "Pao de Assucar (Sugar Loaf)" by Shorty Rogers
 "Paris Pas Rio" by Evinha (member of Trio Esperança)
 "Parque do Flamengo (Flamingo Park)" by Paul Horn
 "Parque Laje (A Park in Rio)" by Paul Horn 
 "Passeio Ho Rio (Walk in Rio)" by Luis Bonfá
 "Pe do Samba" by Mart'nália
 "The People of Rio" by Lincoln Mayorga
 "Piano na Mangueira" by Paula Morelenbaum
 "Pieces of Ipanema" by Azymuth
 "Ponte Entre Rio E Paris" by Evinha (member of Trio Esperança)
 "Praia do Flamengo" by Passport (band)
 "Pregões Cariocas" (originally known as "Cena Carioca") by Braguinha
 "Primavera no Rio" by Carmen Miranda and Heriberto Muraro
 "Prisoner of Rio" by Ronnie B
 "Quiet Nights of Quiet Stars (Corcovado)" by Cannonball Adderley
 "Radio Rio" by Masayoshi Takanaka
 "Rancho do Carioca" by Oscar Castro-Neves
 "Real in Rio" by Sérgio Mendes
 "Rendezvous in Rio" by Michael Franks
 "Rendezvous in Rio" by Philip Green
 "Rhapsody in Rio" by Marcos Ariel with Justo Almario
 "R.I.O" by R.I.O.
 "Riding To Rio" by William Orbit
 "Rio" by Affinity
 "Rio" by Edmundo Ros
 "Rio" by Gerard Joling
 "Rio" by Hubert Giraud
 "Rio" by Lee Morgan
 "Rio" by Leonard Feather
 "Rio" by Les Baxter
 "Rio" by Paul Winter Luiz Bonfá Roberto Menescal Luiz Eça 
 "Rio" by Maywood 
 "Rio" by McCoy Tyner
 "Rio" by Michael Nesmith
 "Rio" by Netsky
 "Rio" by Private Line
 "Rio" by Raul de Souza
 "Rio" by Sylvia Telles
 "Rio" by Victor Feldman
 "Rio" by Victor Silvester
 "Rio" from Welcome to the Club (musical)
 "Rio.com" by Alex Bugnon
 "The Rio Convoy" by Bob Rowe's O.M.O. 
 "Rio 40 Graus" by Fernanda Abreu
 "Rio Acima" by Luiz Bonfa 
 "Rio After Dark" by Lalo Schifrin
 "Rio and Me (Eu E o Rio)" by Walter Wanderley
 "Rio Antigo" by Los Indios Tabajaras
 "Rio Batucada" by George Cates
 "Rio Bonito (Beautiful Rio)" by Laurindo Almeida and the Bossa Nova All Stars 
 "Rio Brasil" by Edmundo Ros
 "The Rio Connection" by Steve Hackett
 "Rio Dawning" by Oscar Castro-Neves
 "Rio de Janeiro" by Afric Simone
 "Rio de Janeiro" by Ary Barroso 
 "Rio de Janeiro" by Barry White
 "Rio de Janeiro" by Bill Wyman
 "Rio de Janeiro" by Edmundo Ros
 "Rio de Janeiro" by Irving Fields Trio
 "Rio de Janeiro" by Patricia Paay
 "Rio de Janeiro" by Sérgio Mendes
 "Rio de Janeiro" by Tele
 "Rio de Janeiro" (from Time Out for Rhythm)
 "Rio de Janeiro" by Ugly Duckling
 "Rio de Janeiro Blue" by Richard Torrance & John Haeny (1977)
 "Rio de Janeiro Blue" by Freddy Cole
 "Rio de Janeiro Underground" by Romero Lubambo
 "Rio de Janvier" by Gold
 "Rio do Brasil" by Dalida
 "Rio Dreamin'" by Johnny "Guitar" Watson 
 "Rio Drive" by Gregg Karukas
 "Rio (Eu Te Quero Mais)" by 
 "Rio et Venise" by Nicole Croisille 
 "Rio Favela" by Mad Professor
 "Rio from the Air" by Vince Guaraldi
 "Rio Funk" by Lee Ritenour
 "Rio Girl" by Timmy Thomas
 "Rio Greyhound" by Stan Ridgway
 "Rio Jam" by Passport
 "Río-Líze" by Vital Information
 "Rio Loco" by Raul de Souza
 "Rio Manhattan" by Hidehiko Matsumoto
 "Rio Nights" by Moulin Rouge Orchestra (featuring Ben Selvin)
 "Rio Nights" by Shakatak
 "Rio Non Stop" by André Gagnon
 "Rio One" by Gerry Mulligan
 "Rio Party Nights" by Stevie B
 "Rio Reggae" by Michel Pagliaro
 "Rio Rhapsody" by Bud Shank
 "Rio Rio" by Lu Colombo
 "Rio Rocks" by Sigue Sigue Sputnik
 "Rio Romance' by Sam Most
 "Rio Rush" by Fourplay
 "Rio Samba" by Joachim Heider & Michael Holm 
 "Rio Samba" by John Brimhall
 "Rio Samba" by Larry Carlton
 "Rio Sangre" by Deodato
 "Rio Sol" by Lee Ritenour
 "Rio Sunrise" by Jim Horn
 "Rio Tropico" by Tim Weisberg
 "Rio with Love" by Luiz Bonfá 
 "Rock & Rio" by Focus
 "Roll Down to Rio" by Peter Bellamy
 "Rolling Down To Rio" from Just So Songs
 "Romantic Rio" by Les Baxter
 "Roses of Rio" by The Four Aces
 "Sabado em Copacabana" by Zelia Duncan
 "Salva o Rio" by Raul de Souza
 "Samba de Janeiro" by Bellini
 "Samba de Orly" (from the animated film Rio)
 "Samba del Rio" by Craig Chaquico
 "Samba do Avião" by Tom Jobim
 "Samba do Carioca" by Elza Soares
 "Samba do Rio" by Tom Jobim
 "Sambamé Rio" by Foxy
 "Saturday in Rio" by Luiz Bonfa & Eumir Deodato
 "See You in Rio" by Elephant's Memory
 "Sex Bomb Boogie" by Sigue Sigue Sputnik
 "She Is Carioca" by Tom Jobim
 "Si Tu Vas À Rio" by Dario Moreno
 "Slow Boat to Rio" by Earl Klugh
 "Som do Rio (The Sound of Rio)" by Paul Horn
 "Son of Rio" by Depth Charge (an alias of Jonathan Saul Kane)
 "Sound of Leblon Beach" by Lizzy Mercier Descloux
 "Souvenir from Rio" by Space
 "Spanish Eyes" by Ricky Martin
 "The Star of Rio" ("Stern von Rio", from the film The Star of Rio)
 "Stars Over Rio" by Victor Silvester
 "Streets of Rio" by Elements
 "Sugar Loaf" by Art Mooney
 "Sugar Loaf" by Dick Hyman
 "Sugarloaf" by Herb Alpert
 "Sugar Loaf" by Luiz Bonfá
 "Sugarloaf at Twilight" by Ahmad Jamal
 "Sugarloaf Express" by Lee Ritenour
 "Sugar Loaf Mountain" by George Duke
 "Sugar Loaf Mountain Rag" by John Sheahan & Michael Howard
 "Sugar Loaf Samba" by Stanley Black<--this is an orchestrated, piano-based Samba that has no words -->
 "Sugar Loaf Sunrise" by Wade Marcus
 "Suiça Carioca" by Azymuth
 "Summer Nights in Rio" by Wilton Felder
 "Swingin' Down To Rio" by Charlie Barnet
 "Take You to Rio", by Justin Bieber, from the animated film Rio
 "Tango del Rio" by Thierry Lang 
 "That's the Way the Money Goes" by M (band)
 "Theme of Rio" by Salomé de Bahia
 "They Met in Rio" by Edmundo Ros
 "Tijuca (dedicated to Ricardo Viñes)" by Darius Milhaud
 "Twilight in Rio" by Victor Silvester
 "Two Tickets for Rio" by Gruppo Sportivo
 "Un Américain Dans les Rues de Rio" by Franck Fernandel
 "Un Poco Rio (Little Rio)" by Joe Harnell
 "Up from the Sea It Arose and Ate Rio in One Swift Bite" by George Duke
 "Valsa Carioca" (from the animated film Rio) 
 "Valsa de uma Cidade" by Teresa Salgueiro 
 "Venceremos - We Will Win" by Working Week 
 "Vida Gal" by Daniela Mercury
 "Virginia Plain" by Roxy Music
 "Viva o Rio" by Raul de Souza 
 "What Do They Do On A Rainy Night In Rio?" by Tony Pastor
 "Suburbio" by Chico Buarque

See also 
 List of songs about cities

References

Rio de Janeiro
Rio de Janeiro
 Songs